The 2015 Sabah earthquake struck Ranau, Sabah, Malaysia with a moment magnitude of 6.0 on 5 June, which lasted for 30 seconds. The earthquake was the strongest to affect Malaysia since the 1976 Sabah earthquake.

Tremors were also felt in Tambunan, Tuaran, Kota Kinabalu, Inanam, Kota Belud, Kota Marudu, Kudat, Likas, Penampang, Putatan, Kinarut, Papar, Beaufort, Keningau, Beluran, Sandakan, Kunak, Tawau in Sabah and as far afield as Federal Territory of Labuan, Lawas, Limbang and Miri in Sarawak as well as Bandar Seri Begawan in Brunei.

Eighteen fatalities were reported, all occurring on Mount Kinabalu, including ten Singaporeans, six Malaysians, and two from both China and Japan. About 137 climbers were stranded on the mountain but were subsequently rescued.

As a result of the earthquake, most areas in the Kinabalu Park have been closed temporarily until the situation is cleared and undergoing repairs and rehabilitation.

Tectonic setting
Sabah lies within the Sunda Plate away from any plate boundaries. It was the location of a convergent plate boundary until some time during the Early Miocene. Since then Sabah has been massively uplifted, with the Kinabalu Granite, which was emplaced during the early Late Miocene (between 7.8 and 7.2 million years ago), being exhumed at a rate of 7 mm per year during Late Miocene–Early Pliocene (~ 8–3 Ma ago). the region continues to rise at a long term rate of about 0.5 mm each year. The uplift is thought to be a result of either break-off of the subducted slab or delamination of the lithosphere. Despite not being at a plate boundary, GPS measurements show that the coastal part of Sabah is moving towards the north-west. The uplift is thought to be driving gravitational collapse with sliding of the northwestern part of Sabah being accommodated by extension. This is consistent with the focal mechanism of earlier earthquakes in the onshore area.

Earthquake
The earthquake occurred on 5 June 2015 at 07:15 a.m. The earthquake was initially reported as 6.0 Mw by the United States Geological Survey (USGS) while the Malaysian Meteorological Department (MetMalaysia) reported the earthquake's magnitude to be 5.9 Ms.

Cause

The earthquake was caused by movement on a SW-NE trending normal fault. As the epicentre of the earthquake was near to Mount Kinabalu, the shaking caused massive landslides around the mountain.

Local native beliefs
According to the claims of local natives, the earthquake was caused by "aki" (the mountain protectors) who had become angered over the acts of ten western tourists (comprising six men and four women from Canada, Germany, the Netherlands and the United Kingdom) who "stripped and urinated at the mountain (which is believed by local natives as a sacred place) on 30 May", six days before the earthquake happened. The tourists also shouted vulgarities when they were told to desist by their mountain guide. The acts provoked outrage among Sabahan natives who want all of the alleged offenders charged in native court and forced to pay the "sogit", a type of compensation, given in the form of money or livestock, to appease the aggrieved party according to local Kadazan-Dusun native customs. It is imposed on wrongdoers for the purpose of appeasing "the aggrieved", thus placating the native community. However, as most of the detained tourists have been released from Malaysia's prison and escaping native court, the local villagers had performed their own rituals. The misconduct was also condemned by the Science Adviser to the Malaysian Prime Minister who said:

The brother of one of the deceased mountain guides also criticised the behaviour of the tourists, saying:

Following the incident, some of the tourist and their family members has express their apology to all involved parties with the United Kingdom government began to reviewing their travelling advice to Malaysia.

Aftershocks
In the immediate aftermath of the earthquake that evening, three aftershocks occurred, with the first and second at 21:10 MST and 23:13 MST respectively, measuring 4.3 magnitude both, while a third at 23:32 MST was 2.8 Mw. By 23 June 90 aftershocks had been reported at Ranau by the Malaysian Meteorological Department, ranging in magnitudes from 1.6 to 5.2.

Casualties

187 climbers were impacted, according to Sabah official sources, with most of them from Malaysia and Singapore, and others from Australia, Belgium, Canada, China, Denmark, France, Germany, India, Ireland, Japan, Kazakhstan, Netherlands, New Zealand, Philippines, South Korea, Thailand, Turkey, United Kingdom and the United States. 137 of them were stranded but subsequently rescued.

The majority of fatalities were teachers and students from a Singaporean climbing group from the Tanjong Katong Primary School; initially reportedly missing, the Singaporeans were later officially confirmed dead by the Singaporean Ministry of Education with an official statement released on 10 June. Malaysian nationals accounted for the second most number of deaths, including two climbers (revised downwards from three initially reported missing) and four mountain guides. Subsequent investigation and witness by other climbers found that the four mountain guides died while protecting climbers. The four guides were identified as Robbi Sapinggi, Valerian Joannes, Ricky Masirin and Joseph Solungin. A Japanese climber also died while protecting one of the Singaporean school students as revealed by the owner of the accommodation where the climber stayed.

List of the dead
As of 10 June, 18 people of 4 nationalities were confirmed dead:

:
 Lu Qi (aged 35)

:
 Ozaki Masahiro (29)

 Joseph Solungin (33)
 Lim Choon Seong (45)
 Muhammad Loqman Abdul Karim (22)
 Ricky Masirin (28)
 Robbi Sapinggi (31)
 Valerian James (30)

:
 Ameer Ryyan Mohd Adeed Sanjay (12)
 Emilie Giovanna Ramu (12)
 Matahom Karyl Higuit (12)
 Muhammad Daanish Amran (22)
 Muhammad Ghazi Mohammed (35)
 Navdeep Singh Jaryal Raj Kumar (13)
 Peony Wee Ying Ping (12)
 Rachel Ho Yann Shiuan (12)
 Sonia Jhala (12)
 Terrence Sebastion Loo Jian Liang (29)

Damage

During the earthquake, one of the peaks on Mount Kinabalu (called the Donkey's Ears) was broken off.
The source of the Poring Hot Springs a popular tourist area near Ranau, turned murky and black for a few hours due to the earthquake, which disrupted a clay deposit that interrupts the fault gap that heats up the rainwater. Some infrastructure was reported damaged with around 23 schools in six different districts affected, and Ranau Mosque was also damaged due to the tremor.

Serious damage occurred to the hostels and resthouse near the summit of Mount Kinabalu. Buildings were similarly affected by the earthquake in Kota Belud and Tuaran. The areas around Kundasang and Ranau suffered water supply disruption when the main water drainage pipe burst, and several plants in both regions were damaged with a leakage in the deposition tank.

Response
Sabah local mountain guides became the first rescuers during the situation, as reported by an Australian climber. Government agencies like the Fire and Rescue Department, Royal Malaysia Police and Malaysian Armed Forces provided equipment during the rescue missions as was reported by the mountain guides. Queen Elizabeth Hospital in Kota Kinabalu was turned into a disaster centre. The National Security Council (NSC) dispatched 25 members of the Special Malaysia Disaster Assistance and Rescue Team (SMART) – paramedics, engineers and rescuers.

Prime Minister Najib Razak ordered efforts to rescue victims stuck on Mount Kinabalu, with the army troops put on standby, as well as a 24-hour helpline being opened. Deputy Prime Minister Muhyiddin Yassin ordered the NSC to introduce an early warning system for earthquakes including for school buildings as well the setting up of a seismic centre to monitor earthquake activities in the state.

Sabah State Government together with the Federal Government donated MYR5,000 (U$1,000+) each for Malaysians who died on the quake while MYR2,000 (U$300+) for injured victims. The Pan-Malaysian Islamic Party (PAS) has launched an impromptu donation drive for victims of the Sabah earthquake at the party's muktamar on 5 June and raised a total of MYR19,800 (around U$5,000+) from delegates. The Barisan Nasional Women's Wing together with the Sabah Community Services Council has also launched a fund, starting with MYR20,000 (US$5,300). The Malaysian Chinese Association (MCA) Sabah branch donated a total of MYR50,000 (US$13,558). An amount of MYR10,000 (US$2,711) also being raised by Democratic Action Party (DAP) Sabah branch to the Kinabalu Mountain Guide Association with another MYR10,000 are given to each family of the four mountain guides who perished during the earthquake.

AirAsia has collaborating with the Malaysia Volunteer Fire and Rescue Association (MVFRA) to transport relief items to Sabah. The Malaysian Communications and Multimedia Commission (MCMC) together with local telecommunications companies have started a public fund. The Malaysian Islamic Development Department (JAKIM) has hold a special prayers for the well-being of the people in Sabah and that the earthquake tragedy does not recur. While the Sarawak State Government and Johor Sultan Ibrahim has donated a total MYR1 million (around US$200,000+) respectively.

Apart from funds and donations granted by government bodies and big corporations, soon after the heroic Robbi Sapinggi was identified as one of the first two victims on the very first day of the earthquake, Robbi's employer, Amazing Borneo, started a crowdfunding campaign on Indiegogo to let people donate to his family especially his newlywed wife and six-month-old son. Many people responded to the campaign to honour his sacrifice and act of bravery.

The Taiwanese Tzu Chi Foundation in Malaysia through its volunteers in Kota Kinabalu conducted a survey to the earthquake site on 6 June for a disaster survey and visiting currently warded victims in local hospital to providing support with the volunteers also accompanied family members of seven victims and handed out cash relief to each of the family.

International reactions
  – Sultan Hassanal Bolkiah has extended his condolences to the Malaysian and Singaporean Prime Ministers.
  – The Government of Timor-Leste offers its condolences to near neighbours Malaysia and Singapore after the loss of life caused by the earthquake and said the nation stands in solidarity with all those affected by the tragedy. Spokesperson for the Government of Timor-Leste, Minister of State Agio Pereira noted, "our thoughts are with all those grieving, particularly those families who have lost their children in this disaster".
  – The Malaysian Government has extended its profound sympathy and deepest condolences to the families of Sabah's quake victims, including foreign nationals. On 6 June, the State Government of Sabah has announced that 8 June will be declared a day of mourning for Sabah where the flag will be flown at half-mast.
  – Prime Minister Lee Hsien Loong hoped for the best on the fate of the missing schoolchildren and their teachers following the earthquake. The Singaporean Ministry of Foreign Affairs (MFA) Crisis Response Team was quickly dispatched to Sabah. Singaporean Ministry of Communications and Information Dr Yaacob Ibrahim expressed his sympathy over the quake; "My thoughts are with the people in Sabah, Malaysia". On 7 June, Prime Minister Lee offered his deepest condolences to all victims and thanked all the Malaysian authorities, the search and rescue teams and hospital staff in Kota Kinabalu, as well as Singaporean officers in the city and Singapore for their efforts. The Singaporean Government declared that 8 June be a national remembrance day with the Singaporean flag being flown at half-mast and a minute of silence being observed at the beginning of all 2015 SEA Games venues.

Memorials
On 5 June 2016, a monument in the form of brass plaque etched with the names of the 18 victims was erected near the base of Mount Kinabalu.

Notes

See also
 List of earthquakes in 2015
 List of earthquakes in Malaysia
 Seismic activity of Malaysia

References

Further reading

External links
 Deadly earthquake hit Malaysia on Earthquake Report Website
 

Sabah earthquake, 2015
Earthquakes in Malaysia
Sabah, 2015
History of Sabah
Mount Kinabalu
June 2015 events in Malaysia
Landslides in Malaysia
2015 disasters in Malaysia